Gholamali Bayandor (December 13, 1898 – August 25, 1941) was the Commander of the Imperial Iranian Navy from 1931 to August 25, 1941, and was killed during the Anglo-Soviet invasion of Iran. He was born in Tehran to ancestors from Bayandur tribe.

He personally led the men defending Iranian coasts at Khorramshahr and was killed in action, dying a described "gallant death".
Commodore Cosmo Graham who served as the Royal Navy's Senior Naval Officer, Persian Gulf wrote that "[h]is death was regretted by all who knew him. He was intelligent, able, and faithful to Persia."

Legacy
Iranian corvette Bayandor, which was commissioned into service in 1964 and is still active, is named after him.

References

Commanders of Imperial Iranian Navy
1898 births
1941 deaths
Iranian military personnel killed in World War II
People from Tehran